Giorgio Ruffolo (14 August 1926 – 16 February 2023) was an Italian economist, journalist and politician who held several government posts and was the minister of environment for five years between 1987 and 1992 in four successive cabinets. He was a member of the now defunct Italian Socialist Party and a significant socialist intellectual. He is known to be the founder of economic planning in Italy.

Biography
Ruffolo was born on 14 August 1926 in Rome. He was part of the Italian Socialist Youth Federation. He headed the research and public relations department of Eni between 1956 and 1962. He joined the Italian Socialist Party and was elected to the Italian Parliament in 1983.

Ruffolo was the president and cofounder of the Europa Research Center (Centro Europa Ricerche), a Rome-based research institute in applied economic analysis with a special reference to the central issues for Italian and European economic policy. The other founders of the institute included Antonio Pedone and Luigi Spaventa. Ruffolo was also the president of a public investment company, Finanziaria Meridionale, which had been established to improve the economic development of Southern Italy.

From 1987 to 1992, Ruffolo was the minister of environment. Although he was an economist by profession, he published various publications on environment, which made him one of the most qualified environment ministers of Italy. During his term, the ministry published the first report about the environmental conditions in the country. 

Ruffolo also served in the European Parliament for three terms: 17 July 1979–30 September 1983; 19 July 1994–19 July 1999 and 20 July 1999–19 July 2004.  

Ruffolo was a contributor to the Italian edition of Huffington Post and Italian newspaper La Repubblica. 

Ruffolo died in Rome on 16 February 2023, at the age of 96.

References

External links

1926 births
2023 deaths
20th-century Italian journalists
21st-century Italian journalists
Environment ministers of Italy
HuffPost bloggers
Italian Socialist Party politicians
Democratic Party of the Left politicians
Democrats of the Left politicians
Democratic Party (Italy) politicians
Italian Socialist Party MEPs
Journalists from Rome
MEPs for Italy 1979–1984
MEPs for Italy 1994–1999
MEPs for Italy 1999–2004
Deputies of Legislature IX of Italy
Deputies of Legislature X of Italy
Deputies of Legislature XI of Italy
Politicians from Rome
La Repubblica people
20th-century Italian economists
Italian ecologists
Sapienza University of Rome alumni